Group C of the 2018–19 Africa Basketball League was the group stage of the 2018–19 Africa Basketball League for Al Ahly, Ferroviário da Beira, Primeiro de Agosto and REG BBC. Each team played each other once, for a total of three games per team, with all games played at the Prince Abdallah Al Faisal Sports Hall in Cairo. After all of the games were played, the two teams with the best records qualified for the final-eight round.

Primeiro de Agosto and Al Ahly finished 1st and 2nd respectively, thus qualifying to the Elite Eight stage.

Squads

Standings

All times are local UTC+2.

Ferroviário vs REG BBC

1º de Agosto vs Al Ahly

1º de Agosto vs REG BBC

Al Ahly vs Ferroviário

Ferroviário vs 1º de Agosto

REG BBC vs Al Ahly

References

External links 
 Official website
 FIBA Africa Official website

FIBA Africa Clubs Champions Cup
2018 in African basketball
2019 in African basketball
2018–19 in basketball leagues